This is a list of presidents of the Institution of Civil Engineers (ICE). The president's role is to represent the institution and to promote the profession to the public. The first president was Thomas Telford who had the office bestowed upon him for life in recognition of his contributions to the civil engineering profession. It became a biennial office with the election of Sir William Cubitt in 1849 and an annual office with the election of Sir George Berkley in 1891, which it has remained since.

On 18 December 1956 Harold Gourley died just six weeks after assuming the office in November. Gourley was the first regularly elected president to die in office (Telford, who was elected president for life, died in office) and the ICE council, who were authorised to fill any vacancy except that of President, were forced to call a Special General Meeting of members. As a result of this meeting, Sir Frederick Arthur Whitaker was elected to the position in February 1957 and was allowed to serve out the remainder of Gourley's term in addition to his own full term. Subsequent deaths-in-office saw Sir Herbert Manzoni succeed Arthur Hartley in February 1960; and Tony Ridley succeed Edmund Hambly in March 1995.

Current practice is for candidates to be nominated by the ICE Presidential Selection Panel. The candidate will then serve as one of several vice-presidents of the institution, becoming senior vice-president in the session preceding their term as president. The candidate is formally elected as president by the ICE council in the January of their senior vice-presidential term. The new president takes office at the start of the ICE session in November, the opening meeting being an address from the incoming president.

The first female president, Jean Venables, was elected in May 2008, and the second, Rachel Skinner, in 2020. The current president is Keith Howells.

See also
 Institution of Civil Engineers

Notes

References

Civil engineering organizations
 
Institution of Civil Engineers
Institution of Civil Engineers